Techobanine is a coastal village in Mozambique.

Transport 

In 2011, an agreement was signed between Mozambique and Botswana for the construction of a deepwater port.

See also 
 Technobanine Point

References 

Populated places in Mozambique